Careful What You Wish For may refer to:
Careful What You Wish For (Jonatha Brooke album), 2007
Careful What You Wish For (Texas album), 2003
"Careful What You Wish For", a bonus track on Eminem's album Relapse
Careful What You Wish For (film), a 2015 thriller film